The Art Bridge is a pedestrian bridge across the Vardar River in the centre of Skopje, the capital city of North Macedonia. The bridge features many statues of noted Macedonian artists and musicians. It was built as part of the larger Skopje 2014 project, with an estimated construction cost of €2.5 million. The bridge includes 29 sculptures, with 14 at each side and one in the centre.

Statues

References 

Bridges in Skopje
Buildings and structures in Skopje
Pedestrian bridges in North Macedonia